Hilal Kaplan (born August 15, 1982 in Istanbul, Turkey) is a Turkish journalist and TRT board member and columnist for the Turkish newspaper Sabah.

Biography 
Kaplan graduated from Istanbul Bilgi University and then joined the Department of Psychology  in 2004.

In 2006, she started her master's degree in Sociology at Boğaziçi University.

Awards 

 Turkey and Armenia Dialogue Award (2012)
 Columnist of the Year Anadolu Media Award (2018)
 award Book of the Year (2021)

References 

Living people
Turkish novelists
21st-century Turkish women politicians
1982 births
Turkish women writers
Journalists from Istanbul
Istanbul Bilgi University alumni
Boğaziçi University alumni